Big Brother 11 is the eleventh season of various versions of Big Brother and may refer to:

 Big Brother 11 (U.S.), the 2009 edition of Big Brother in the U.S.
 Gran Hermano Spain (season 11), the 2009-2010 edition of Big Brother in Spain
 Big Brother 11 (UK), the 2010 edition of Big Brother in the UK
 Grande Fratello (season 11), the 2010-2011 edition of Big Brother in Italy
 Big Brother Brasil 11, the 2011 edition of Big Brother in Brazil
 Big Brother Germany (season 11), the 2011 edition of Big Brother in Germany
 Big Brother Australia (season 11), the 2014 edition of "Big Brother" in Australia

See also
 Big Brother (franchise)
 Big Brother (disambiguation)